Songs from Tsongas: 35th Anniversary Concert is a live video and album by the English rock band Yes, released on DVD in 2005 and CD and Blu-ray in 2014 by Image Entertainment. It was recorded at the Tsongas Arena in Lowell, Massachusetts on 15 May 2004 during the band's 2004 tour in celebration of their 35th anniversary. It is the band's last live album to feature original singer Jon Anderson.

Contents 
The setlist features songs from all eras of the band's career, including a rare performance of "Every Little Thing" from their first album, Yes (1969) and "Mind Drive" from Keys to Ascension (1996)

Release 
On 23 September 2014, a Deluxe Edition was released on DVD, Blu-ray, and three CDs. The video also features a 70-minute edit of the band's show at the Lugano Jazz Festival in Lugano, Switzerland on 8 July 2004. The Japanese edition of the Blu-ray release includes the entire show at Lugano and "Ritual (Nous sommes du soleil)" in the correct place in the Lowell show, instead of being offered as a bonus track on the international release. On both editions, the Lugano concert is presented in standard definition with 720x480 resolution.

Personnel
Jon Anderson – vocals, MIDI guitar, percussion, keyboards
Steve Howe – guitars, vocals, Portuguese guitar
Rick Wakeman – keyboards, synthesizers, piano
Chris Squire – bass, harmonica, vocals
Alan White – drums, percussion

Track listing

2004 DVD
Disc One
"Firebird Suite"
"Going for the One"
"Sweet Dreams"Preceded by an Alan White solo.
"I've Seen All Good People"
a. "Your Move"
b. "All Good People"
"Mind Drive (Parts 1 & 2)"
"South Side of the Sky"
"Turn of the Century"
"My Eyes (Excerpt from 'Foot Prints')/Mind Drive (Part 3)"
"Yours Is No Disgrace"

Bonus Feature: Roger Dean interview

Disc Two
"The Meeting Room (Rick Wakeman piano solo)/The Meeting (Acoustic)"
"Long Distance Runaround (Acoustic)"
"Wonderous Stories (Acoustic)"
"Time Is Time (Acoustic)"
"Roundabout (Acoustic)"
"Show Me (Acoustic)"
"Owner of a Lonely Heart (Acoustic)"
"Second Initial (Steve Howe acoustic solo)"
"Rhythm of Love"
"And You and I"
I. "Cord of Life"
II. "Eclipse"
III. "The Preacher, the Teacher"
IV. "Apocalypse
"Ritual (Nous Sommes du Soleil)"
"Every Little Thing"
"Starship Trooper"
a. "Life Seeker"
b. "Disillusion"
c. "Würm"

2014 Blu-ray and CD

CD 1
"Intro/Firebird Suite"
"Going for the One"
"Sweet Dreams"
"I've Seen All Good People"
"Mind Drive Parts 1 & 2"
"South Side of the Sky"
"Turn of the Century"
"My Eyes"
"Mind Drive Part 3"
"Yours Is No Disgrace"

CD 2
"The Meeting (Piano Solo)"
"Long Distance Runaround"
"Wonderous Stories"
"Time Is Time"
"Roundabout"
"Show Me"
"Owner of a Lonely Heart"
"Second Initial (Guitar Solo)"
"Rhythm of Love"

CD 3
"And You and I"
"Ritual (Nous Sommes du Soleil)"
"Every Little Thing"
"Starship Trooper"

Blu-ray Bonus Features
"Ritual (Nous Sommes du Soleil)"
Roger Dean interview
Live in Lugano 2004:
"Firebird Suite"
"Going for the One"
"Sweet Dreams"
"I've Seen All Good People"
"Long Distance Runaround"
"The Fish"
"Owner of a Lonely Heart"
"And You and I"
"Starship Trooper"
"Roundabout"

Charts

References

Yes (band) video albums
Yes (band) live albums
2005 video albums
Live video albums
2005 live albums
Albums with cover art by Roger Dean (artist)